Mohamed Ali Ben Hammouda (born 24 July 1998) is a Tunisian professional footballer who plays for  Espérance de Tunis.

References

External links

1998 births
Living people
Association football forwards
AS Soliman players
Espérance Sportive de Tunis players
Tunisian Ligue Professionnelle 1 players
Tunisian footballers